John Crocket Bowis OBE (born 2 August 1945 in Brighton, East Sussex) is a former Conservative MP and MEP.

Education 
John Bowis was educated at Tonbridge School and Brasenose College, Oxford, where he studied Philosophy, Politics and Economics.

Political life 

He was first elected at the 1987 general election as Member of Parliament for Battersea. From 1993 to 1996 he was a health minister and from 1996 to 1997 he was a transport minister, before losing his parliamentary seat at the 1997 general election.

At the 1999 European Parliament election Bowis was elected to represent the London region. He was re-elected in 2004, and stood down at the 2009 election.

He has been National Secretary of the Federation of Conservative Students and worked at the Institute of Psychiatry.

He is an active member of the ACP-EU Joint Parliamentary Assembly.

He has served as president of Gay Conservatives, an LGBT group within the Conservative Party.

He is the incumbent vice president of the Conservative Group for Europe (CGE).

Notes

External links

Profile on European Parliament website
 John Bowis – John Bowis OBE

1945 births
Living people
People educated at Tonbridge School
Alumni of Brasenose College, Oxford
Conservative Party (UK) MPs for English constituencies
UK MPs 1987–1992
UK MPs 1992–1997
Conservative Party (UK) MEPs
MEPs for England 1999–2004
MEPs for England 2004–2009
Officers of the Order of the British Empire
Gay politicians
English LGBT politicians
LGBT MEPs for the United Kingdom
LGBT members of the Parliament of the United Kingdom